Yengikand-e Khusheh Mehr (also Romanized as Yengīkand-e Khūsheh Mehr; also known as Yengī Kand) is a village in Benajuy-ye Sharqi Rural District, in the Central District of Bonab County, East Azerbaijan Province, Iran. At the 2006 census, its population was 1,131, in 241 families.

References 

Populated places in Bonab County